St Augustine's Church is a redundant Anglican church building in the city of Norwich, Norfolk, England. It is recorded in the National Heritage List for England as a designated Grade I listed building. and is under the care of the Churches Conservation Trust.  The church stands to the west of St Augustine's Street, the A1024 road, to the north of the Norwich inner ring road.

History

St Augustine's is the only pre-Reformation church in Norfolk with this dedication. The earliest documentary evidence of a church dedicated to St Augustine in Norwich dates from 1163 in a letter from the bishop of Norwich, William de Turbe, to the prior of Llanthony Secunda Priory in Gloucester. Nothing of this Norman church survives. The church was substantially rebuilt in the early 15th century. The tower was added in 1682–87 after the flint tower collapsed. The date 1687 was added, presumably on completion, to the east-facing parapet. In the 1880s R. M. Phipson restored part of the fabric of the church and reordered the interior.  During the 20th century the condition of the building deteriorated. By the 1990s the tower had become dangerous and the church's three 17th-century Norwich-made bells (which pre-date the new tower) were removed and donated to All Saints church, Carleton Rode.  The church was declared redundant on 18 March 1975, and was vested in the Churches Conservation Trust on 19 April 2000.  As of 2000, the congregation meets in the church hall. But the church is still used on high days and holidays.

Architecture

Exterior
The body of the church is constructed in flint with stone and brick dressings. The tower is in brick on a flint plinth, and is the only one of its kind in the city.  The church is square in plan, with the nave and chancel being similar in length, and the aisles running along their full length. There is also a clerestory extending along the length of the nave, a south porch, and a rood turret against the wall of the north aisle.  The tower is at the west end, and is in three stages.  In the lowest stage is a west window with a pointed arch. The middle stage contains small square windows on each side, and in the top stage the bell openings have two lights.  The parapet is rendered and battlemented.  The nave is in four bays and contains two-light windows with Decorated tracery.  The clerestory has four two-light windows on each side containing Y-tracery.  The chancel is in two bays, with three-light Perpendicular windows in the aisles, and a five-light east window.

Interior
The arcades are carried on octagonal piers.  The font dates from the 15th century.  The pews and the reredos are from the 1880s, and the chancel screen, which incorporates the pulpit and a reading desk, was added in 1920 as a memorial to those who died in the First World War. The memorials include a marble wall monument to the Palladian architect Matthew Brettingham, who designed Holkham Hall, and other family members, and one to a textile manufacturer, Thomas Clabburn, erected by "upwards of six hundred of the weavers of Norwich and assistants". A mural memorial in the north nave aisle commemorates a Boston (Mass.) -born merchant, Thomas Churchman Newman, who died in Norwich in 1787. He was an older brother of Robert Newman (sexton), whose belfry signal sparked off the American Revolution in 1775. There is little stained glass; that in the east window dates from 1870, and the glass in the north chancel aisle, depicting SS Felix of Dunwich and Augustine of Canterbury, dates from 1901. A window in the south nave aisle, depicting the Virgin Mary, Mary Magdalene and an angel at the empty tomb of Jesus Christ, dates from 1918 and is a memorial to a soldier of the parish who was killed in action in 1917 (see below). The two-manual organ was transferred from St Peter's Church, Hungate, (which is now a museum).  It was built in 1875–78 by John Rayson, and restored in 1959–60 by Hill, Norman & Beard.

War Memorials
There are four different memorials associated with the First World War in the church.  The largest is the Roll of Honour inscribed on the chancel screen.  This oak screen is imitative of a medieval rood screen with Gothic tracery above and panels below.  According to the Faculty notes, it was designed by Mr. F. Varney of Messrs Morgan & Buckingham of Norwich and was made for a cost of £90 by Howard & Sons, the Norwich Ecclesiastical Wood Carvers; the money raised by the parish's 'working class Parishioners'. Two panels on the east-facing side commemorate individual soldiers connected with the church (a Sunday school teacher, Rifleman Edward Halfacre, Post Office Rifles and a teacher and member of the choir, Private Edward Sizer, Army Service Corps) and a panel on the far left has a record of the Roll of Honour's presentation by the Bishop of Norwich, the Rt Rev Bertram Pollock on Sunday 25 January 1920.  The west-facing side lists 79 servicemen who died on active service or shortly after discharge. It is unusual in mentioning the name of Private John Henry Abigail of the 8th Battalion, Norfolk Regiment, shot for desertion in France 12 September 1917, a very rare example of an executed British serviceman of the 1914-18 war being listed on a local war memorial. Private Abigail was pardoned by HM Government in 2006. The memorial also includes names of one man who served in the Australian Imperial Force, Lance Corporal Clarence Neasham; three who served in the Canadian Expeditionary Force, brothers Private George and Lance Corporal Arthur Howell and Private Thomas Crosskill; one who served in the American Expeditionary Force, Private James Cooke; and one who service in the Royal Naval Air Service and Royal Air Force, Air Mechanic Frank Brighty.

There are additional memorials to individuals.  Lance Corporal Arthur Cannell of the 6th (Cyclist) Battalion and 1st Battalion, Norfolk Regiment was killed in the Battle of the Somme on 4 September 1916 at the age of 26.  The brothers Second Lieutenant Bertie W. Benn and Second Lieutenant Walter H. Benn (both promoted from the ranks) are commemorated on a marble plaque erected by their parents Mr. J and Mrs. E Benn.  Bertie Benn was killed in the Battle of the Somme on 19 July 1916, aged 27, and Walter H. Benn died in action in France on 2 August 1917, aged 26.  A memorial stained glass window designed by George Skipper and manufactured by Morris & Co. is dedicated to Lance Corporal Leonard Harry Pert of the 8th Battalion, Rifle Brigade, killed at the Battle of Arras on 3 May 1917.  The window depicts the Virgin Mary and Mary Magdalene before an angel at the empty tomb of Jesus. 
There is also a memorial to the parish's war dead of the Second World War that lists the names of eight servicemen and five civilians, including four from one family killed during the Baedeker Blitz on Norwich on 27 April 1942.http://www.staugustinesnorwich.org.uk/History_-_Rolls_of_Honour.html

See also
List of churches preserved by the Churches Conservation Trust in the East of England

References

External links
Norfolk Churches: with photographs of the exterior and interior
St. Augustine's Church on the Churches Conservation Trust website

Saint Augustine
English Gothic architecture in Norfolk
15th-century church buildings in England
Churches preserved by the Churches Conservation Trust
Grade I listed churches in Norfolk